Robert Lebeck (21 March 1929 – 14 June 2014) was an award-winning German photojournalist.

Biography
At the age of fifteen Lebeck was drafted into the Wehrmacht and sent to the Eastern Front where he was captured as a POW by the Soviet Army. Finally repatriated after World War II, he finished high school at the Donaueschingen Fürstenberg Gymnasium, and went on to study ethnology in Zurich and New York. Self-taught as a photographer, he started in 1952 as a freelancer  selling to various newspapers and magazines in Heidelberg.  Lebeck then went on to be employed by the magazines Illustrierte wie Revue and Kristall, and finally by the German weekly news magazine Stern. He worked for Stern for thirty years as a photojournalist, with a brief sabbatical during 1977 to 1978, as editor-in-chief of the monthly educational magazine Geo. Since 2001 Lebeck has resided in Berlin.

Lebeck became well known in 1960 after his report on the independence of the Congo "Afrika im Jahre Null" ("Africa in Year Zero") which included a photograph of an African man, Ambroise Boimbo pinching the ceremonial sword of Belgian King Baudouin.  To this day that picture remains his "calling card".

Awards
2007 Henri Nannen Lifetime Achievement Award

Exhibits
"Tokio-Moskau-Leopoldville", Hamburg Arts and Crafts Museum (Museum für Kunst und Gewerbe), Hamburg 1961
"Sammlung R.L. - Fotografie des 19. Jahrhunderts", Neue Nationalgalerie, Berlin 1982
"Augenzeuge Robert Lebeck - 30 Jahre Zeitgeschichte", Stadtmuseum, Kiel 1983
"Robert Lebeck - Fotoreportagen", Perpignan (south of France) 1991
"Kiosk. Eine Geschichte der Fotoreportage", Museum Ludwig, Cologne 2001
"Unverschämtes Glück", Willy Brandt House, Berlin 2004
"Robert Lebeck - Neugierig auf Welt", Galerie & Edition Bode, Nuremberg 2008
"Robert Lebeck. Fotografien 1955-2005", Martin-Gropius-Bau, Berlin 2008

Notes

References
Kayser, Gisela (2009) Robert Lebeck, Fotoreporter  (Robert Lebeck, Photojournalist) Steidl, Göttingen, a catalog for the 28 November 2008 to 23 March 2009 Martin-Gropius-Bau exhibit, in German
Schmidt, E. (2009) "Bilder und Reisen - Gesprach mit dem Fotoreporter Robert Lebeck" ("Pictures and Travel - Interview with the Photojournalist Robert Lebeck") Die Zeit 64(9): pp. 66–68, in German
Staff (2009) "Die Tricks des Haudegen - Photographie im Gesprach mit Reporter-Legende Robert Lebeck" ("The tricks of the warhorse - Photographie interviews the legendary reporter Robert Lebeck") Photographie 33(3): pp. 108–111, in German
Staff (2008) "Robert Lebeck - Fotografie: Retrospektive eines grossen Fotoreporters" ("Robert Lebeck - Photography: Retrospective of one of the great photojournalists") Du no. 791: pp. 68–81, in German
Staff (2006) "Portfolio - Robert Lebeck" Color Foto 36(3): pp. 78–88, in German
Jocks, H. N. (2006) "Robert Lebeck: Neugierig auf Welt" ("Robert Lebeck: Curious about the World") Kunstforum International no. 181:  pp. 154–77, in German
Zeeb, R. (April 1984) "Die ersten dreissig Jahre der Fotografie" ("The first thirty years of photography") [Stadtmuseum Kiel; Sammlung Robert Lebeck]. Das Kunstwerk v. 37 (April 1984) p. 82-3

External links

Website of Robert Lebeck
"Robert Lebeck. Fotografien 1955–2005" – Exhibit 2008/09
Photographs of Robert Lebeck
"Ausstellungen von Robert Lebeck" ("Exhibits of robert Lebeck"), Ausstellungsbüro Fahrenberg

German photojournalists
German military personnel of World War II
Photographers from Berlin
1929 births
2014 deaths
Stern (magazine) people
German magazine editors